Pirates and Mayors was a liberal progressive centrist political alliance in the Czech Republic, formed for the 2021 legislative election, consisting of the Czech Pirate Party (Piráti) and Mayors and Independents (STAN). As of the 2021 Czech election it governs the Czech Republic in a coalition with the SPOLU alliance.

History
Following the 2020 regional elections, opposition parties began negotiations about potential electoral alliances. Speculation began about a liberal bloc composed of the Pirate Party and Mayors and Independents, with Ivan Bartoš as the leader.

The leadership of Mayors and Independents agreed to start negotiations on 8 October 2020. The Pirates were required to ratify any alliance in a members' referendum. A poll on 20 October 2020 indicated that 51% of Pirate Party members were opposed to the alliance while 43% supported it. The referendum to start negotiations for an alliance was originally scheduled for 13 to 16 November 2020, but was rescheduled for 20 to 23 November 2020. Among Pirate Party members, 695 out of 858 voted in favor of negotiations, with a turnout of 80%. Ivan Bartoš was nominated as the Pirate Party's election leader on 25 November 2020, and was confirmed on 2 December 2020. The Pirates also offered the Green Party the possibility to join its electoral list. Ivan Bartoš was confirmed as the alliance's electoral leader on 14 December 2020. Pirate Party members voted to approve the alliance on 13 January 2021.

The alliance participated in the 2021 legislative election, finishing third with 15.6% of the votes and 37 seats, which was considered a disappointment. Due to preference voting, Mayors and Independents won 33 seats and the Czech Pirate Party won just 4 seats. Some media reports said that the atmosphere between STAN and Pirates had become more tense following the election, leading to speculation about the potential dissolution of the alliance, with the Pirates remaining in opposition. However, in early November, Pirates and Mayors signed a coalition agreement to form a government with SPOLU. Following coalition negotiations with SPOLU, the alliance was assigned seven ministries of the government, out of which four are for Mayors and Independents and three for Pirates.

In November, Rakušan stated that STAN will not enter the next election on a joint list with the Pirates.

Member parties

Regional leaders in the 2021 election

Election results

Footnotes

External links
  
 

Political parties established in 2020
Political party alliances in the Czech Republic
Czech Pirate Party
Mayors and Independents
Liberal parties in the Czech Republic
Direct democracy parties in the Czech Republic
Pro-European political parties in the Czech Republic
Progressive parties
2020 establishments in the Czech Republic
2021 Czech legislative election